Sanicula bipinnata is a species of plant in the family Apiaceae known by the common name poison sanicle. It is endemic to California where it is found in low-elevation mountains and foothills, especially in the hills along the coast. It occurs in the California Coastal Range and Sierra Nevada foothills, including Ring Mountain, California.

Description
It is recognizable as a relative of the carrots and parsnips with its thin stalk topped with small umbels of yellow or cream flowers. The origin of its poisonous reputation is unknown.  Yet despite the name, there are no current records of its toxicity in humans, though it or a related species might be toxic to horses or other stock animals.  It was called  by the Miwok and used to treat venomous bites from snakes, perhaps providing a reason for the common name in English.  Though they used other sanicles in the same manner.  The Karuk called the plant  and traditionally ate the young leaves as a green, indicating the toxic reputation is undeserved.

References

External links
 Calflora Database: Sanicula bipinnata (Poison sanicle)
  Jepson Manual eFlora (TJM2) treatment of Sanicula bipinnata
USDA Plants Profile for Sanicula bipinnata (poison sanicle)
 U.C. Photos gallery of Sanicula bipinnata (poison sanicle) images
 

bipinnata
Endemic flora of California
Flora of the Sierra Nevada (United States)
Natural history of the California chaparral and woodlands
Natural history of the California Coast Ranges
Natural history of the Peninsular Ranges
Natural history of the Santa Monica Mountains
Natural history of the Transverse Ranges
Flora without expected TNC conservation status